Jean Guyot (Châtelet, Belgium, 1512 - 1588) was a Franco-Flemish renaissance composer.

After studies at the University of Louvain, where he earned in 1537 the grade of Bachelor of Arts, he became chaplain to the Collegiate Church of St. Paul in Liège where he filled the office of Master of the Chapel at the Saint-Lambert Cathedral. In 1563, he became Kapellmeister to the Imperial Court in Vienna for one year. In 1564, he returned to Liège to the Cathedral where he led the music activities for twenty-five years. He was highly regarded by his contemporaries, including Hermann Finck. In addition to music (chansons, motets, a Te Deum), he also published a poetical work.

Works
Secular Music

En lieux d'esbatz m'assault melancolie
Je suis amoureux d'une fille
Vous estes si doulce et benigne
L'arbre d'amour ung fruict d'amaritude
Vous perdez temps de me dire mal d'elle
Tel en mesdict sui pour soy la desire

Sacred Music

Te Deum laudamus
Amen, amen dico vobis
Te Deum Patrem
Omni tempore benedic Deum
O florens rosa
Accepit Jesus panem
Prudentes virgines
Adorna thalamum
Noe, noe, genuit puerpera
Ave Maria

Recordings
Amorosi Pensieri Cinquecento (early music group) (Hyperion Records,  CDA68053, 2014)
Te Deum laudamus & other sacred music Cinquecento (early music group) (Hyperion Records,  CDA68180, 2017)

References

1512 births
1588 deaths
16th-century composers